The Tinoliinae are a subfamily of moths in the family Erebidae.

Taxonomy
Phylogenetic analysis only weakly supports the subfamily as a clade. The subfamily may be significantly revised after further study.

Genera
Poeta
Tamsia
Tinolius

References

 
Moth subfamilies